Dorcas "Darkey" Kelly (died 7 January 1761) was an Irish brothel-keeper and alleged serial killer who was burned at the stake in Dublin in 1761.

Biography
Dorcas Kelly was a madam who operated the Maiden Tower brothel on Copper Alley, off Fishamble Street in the southwest part of Dublin, Ireland. Convicted of killing shoemaker John Dowling on St. Patrick's Day 1760, Kelly was executed by partial hanging and burning at the stake on Gallows Road (modern Baggot Street) on 7 January 1761. After her execution she was waked by prostitutes on Copper Alley; thirteen of them were arrested for disorder and sent to Newgate Prison, Dublin.

An account of the 1773 execution of the murderer Mrs Herring at Tyburn, London, gives an idea of what Kelly's execution may have been like:

A 1788 account in the World newspaper claims that her brothel was investigated by the authorities and that investigators then found the corpses of five men hidden in the vaults. However, this does not appear in any contemporary account of her trial and execution and appears to be a later embellishment.

Legend
Various legends grew up around Kelly after her execution. The most common story is that she became pregnant with the child of Dublin's Sheriff Simon Luttrell, 1st Earl of Carhampton, a member of the Hellfire Club and probable client of Kelly's Maiden Tower. She demanded financial support from him. He responded by accusing her of witchcraft and of having killed their baby in a Satanic ritual. The body was never found. Darkey was then burnt at the stake.

This story may have its origin in one told about Luttrell's son Henry, who supposedly raped a girl in a brothel, and then had the girl and her family imprisoned under false charges.

Legacy
A pub on Fishamble Street, near where her brothel once stood, is named Darkey Kelly's.

See also
List of serial killers by country

References

1761 deaths
18th-century executions
18th-century Irish businesspeople
18th-century Irish criminals
18th-century Irish women
Criminals from Dublin (city)
Executed Irish women
Irish brothel owners and madams
People executed by Ireland by burning
People executed by the Kingdom of Ireland
Suspected serial killers